Lagoa Grande may refer to the following places in Brazil:

Lagoa Grande, Minas Gerais
Lagoa Grande, Pernambuco
Lagoa Grande do Maranhão, Maranhão